Les Etchemins is a regional county municipality in the Chaudière-Appalaches region of eastern Quebec, Canada. It is named for the Etchemin River which finds its source in the region, as well as Etchemin Lake. Lac-Etchemin is the seat of the RCM. Les Etchemins can be found on the Maine border, southeast of Quebec City.

Subdivisions
There are 13 subdivisions within the RCM:

Municipalities (10)
 Lac-Etchemin
 Saint-Benjamin
 Sainte-Aurélie
 Sainte-Justine
 Sainte-Rose-de-Watford
 Saint-Louis-de-Gonzague
 Saint-Luc-de-Bellechasse
 Saint-Magloire
 Saint-Prosper
 Saint-Zacharie

Parishes (3)
 Saint-Camille-de-Lellis
 Saint-Cyprien
 Sainte-Sabine

Transportation

Access Routes
Highways and numbered routes that run through the municipality, including external routes that start or finish at the county border:

 Autoroutes
 None

 Principal Highways
 None

 Secondary Highways
 
 
 
 

 External Routes
 None

See also
 List of regional county municipalities and equivalent territories in Quebec

References

External links
 Les Etchemins Regional County Municipality

Regional county municipalities in Chaudière-Appalaches
Census divisions of Quebec